The fifteenth legislative assembly election was held on 6 April 2021 to elect members from 30 constituencies of the 15th Puducherry Assembly in the union territory of Puducherry in India. The National democratic alliance has won a simple majority

Background
In the previous elections in 2016, the election brought a change of power as the All India N.R. Congress (AINRC), which had formed the government under N. Rangaswamy, lost its majority to the Indian National Congress (INC), led by V. Narayanasamy.

In the previous elections in 2016 Indian National Congress (INC) emerged as Single Largest Party with 15 seats, with the support of Dravida Munnetra Kazhagam (DMK) the government was formed.

Schedule

Parties and alliances



PMK supports this alliance without contesting in any seat.



Candidates

Polls and surveys

Opinion polls

Exit polls

Voter Turnout

Result

Results by party

Results by party and alliance

Results by district

Results by constituency

Government formation

Even though results for the election were declared on 2 May, the government formation was finalized  on 8 June.
The results were with NDA winning 16 seats (AIRNC :- 10, BJP :- 6) and UPA winning 9 seats (DMK :- 6, INC :- 2, Independent :- 1) and 5 Independents not backed by either of the alliance won.
Immediately the NDA unanimously elected N. Rangaswamy from AIRNC as the CM, and the UPA elected R.Siva from the DMK as the Leader Of Opposition.
Post results the central government nominated 3 MLAs affiliated to the BJP, thereby taking NDA to 19 seats and BJP to 9.
Furthermore, before the swearing in of the government, 3 Independent MLAs pledged support to AIRNC and 2 Independent MLAs pledged support to BJP, also the 1 Independent MLA backed by UPA during election later switched allegiance to BJP. The NDA MLAs increased to 25 and UPA decreased to 8.
Even after the swearing in ceremony of the CM, the talks between AIRNC and BJP on cabinet composition and assembly speaker continued for more than a month. On 8 June the alliance announced that the BJP would get 2 ministers and the post of assembly speaker, while AIRNC will get 3 ministers.

See also
2021 elections in India
2021 Tamil Nadu Legislative Assembly election
2019 Indian general election in Puducherry

References

Notes 

2021 State Assembly elections in India
State Assembly elections in Puducherry
2020s in Puducherry